Pirdana is a genus of grass skippers in the family Hesperiidae.

Species
Pirdana albicornis Elwes & Edwards, 1897 Borneo
Pirdana hyela (Hewitson, 1867) Burma, Malaya to Celebes and (P. h. rudolphii Elwes & de Nicéville, [1887] ) Vietnam
Pirdana distanti Staudinger, 1889 Sumatra, Malaya, Borneo and (P. d. niasica Fruhstorfer, 1916) Nias
Pirdana fusca de Jong & Treadaway, 1993 Samar
Pirdana ismene (C. & R. Felder, [1867]) Celebes

Biology 
The larvae feed on  Dracaenaceae including Dracaena, Agavaceae including Cordyline, Convallariaceae including Peliosanthes

References

Natural History Museum Lepidoptera genus database
"Pirdana  Distant, 1886" at Markku Savela's Lepidoptera and Some Other Life Forms

Hesperiinae
Hesperiidae genera